The Parson of Panamint is a lost 1916 American Western silent film directed by William Desmond Taylor and written by Julia Crawford Ivers and Peter B. Kyne. The film stars Dustin Farnum, Winifred Kingston, Pomeroy Cannon, Howard Davies, Colin Chase and Ogden Crane. The film was released on September 3, 1916, by Paramount Pictures.

Plot

Cast  
 Dustin Farnum as Philip Pharo
 Winifred Kingston as Buckskin Liz
 Pomeroy Cannon as Chuckawalla Bill 
 Howard Davies as Bud Deming
 Colin Chase as Chappie Ellerton
 Ogden Crane as Absolom Randall
 Jane Keckley as Arabella Randall
 Tom Bates as Crabapple Thompson

References

External links 
 

1916 films
1916 Western (genre) films
Paramount Pictures films
Films directed by William Desmond Taylor
American black-and-white films
Lost Western (genre) films
Lost American films
1916 lost films
Silent American Western (genre) films
1910s English-language films
1910s American films